Mount Ngerchelchuus is the Republic of Palau's highest point, located at the border of the states of Ngardmau and Ngaremlengui, on the island of Babeldaob.

References

Mountains of Palau
Ngeremlengui
Ngardmau
Ngerchelchuus